Parakulangara Thazathel Ajay Mohan is a social and political leader in Kerala. Ajay Mohan was born on 10 May 1965, as the fourth child and second son of PT Mohanakrishnan and Nalini Mohanakrishnan.

Personal life
Following his father PT Mohanakrishnan, All India Congress Committee (AICC) member and former Member of the Legislative Assembly (MLA), Ajay Mohan entered politics through K.S.U. while doing his studies in Sree Krishna College, Guruvayoor.

He has held various positions in the Indian National Congress (INC) party. He has served as the Youth Congress Ponnani Block President, Youth Congress Malappuram District President and Malappuram DCC General Secretary.

Presently he is the Kerala Pradesh Congress Committee (KPCC) secretary. Along with it he handles the responsibilities of Malappuaram District Bank Director and Andathode Co-operative Bank President.

Political life
Ajay Mohan is currently secretary of  the KPCC and Overseas Indian Cultural Congress (OICC) member. He was also the candidate representing the INC in the Ponnani constituency for the 2011 Kerala Legislative Assembly election, in which he lost by a small margin of 4,101 votes.

In May 2015 Ajay Mohan started an indefinite hunger strike demanding a detailed probe into the alleged irregularities in the construction of Chamravatom RCB and Ponnani fishing harbour, at Ponnani on 26 May 2015.

Positions held
 Secretary, Kerala Pradesh Congress Committee
 Block President - Youth Congress, Ponnani
 District President - Youth Congress, Malappuram
 General Secretary - District Congress Committee.

References

People from Malappuram district
Indian National Congress politicians from Kerala
Living people
Malayali politicians
1965 births